Kappa Cassiopeiae (κ Cas, κ Cassiopeiae) is a star in the constellation Cassiopeia.

κ Cassiopeiae has an unusual spectrum that has anomalously weak nitrogen lines, taken as an actual nitrogen deficiency in the atmosphere.  This is indicated by the modified letter C on the assumption that it is also carbon-rich, although this might not actually be the case.  It is also interpolated to BC0.7, being slightly hotter than a standard B1 star.

It is classified as an Alpha Cygni type variable star and its brightness varies by a few hundredths of a magnitude.  Periods of two hours, 2.65 days, and nine days have been reported from observations at different times.

It is a runaway star, moving at around 2.5 million mph relative to its neighbors (1,100 kilometers per second).  Its magnetic field and wind of particles creates a visible bow shock 4 light-years ahead of it, colliding with the diffuse, and usually invisible, interstellar gas and dust. This is about the same distance that Earth is from Proxima Centauri, the nearest star to the Sun. The dimensions of the bow shock are vast: around 12 light-years long and 1.8 light-years wide.

References

Alpha Cygni variables
Cassiopeiae, Kappa
Cassiopeiae, 15
B-type supergiants
Cassiopeia (constellation)
Runaway stars
0130
002905
002599
BD+62 0102